The 1996–97 Duleep Trophy was the 36th season of the Duleep Trophy, a first-class cricket tournament contested by five zonal teams of India: Central Zone, East Zone, North Zone, South Zone and West Zone.

Central Zone won the title, defeating South Zone in the final. It was their second win in 25 years.

Results

Final

References

External links
 Tournament home at ESPNcricinfo archive
 

Duleep Trophy seasons
Duleep Trophy
Duleep Trophy